Jonathan Stewart Davidson (born 1 March 1970) is an English former professional footballer who played as a full-back in the Football League for Derby County, Preston North End and Chesterfield. He also played for a number of teams in non-League football, most notably Dagenham & Redbridge.

References

1970 births
Living people
People from Cheadle, Staffordshire
English footballers
Association football defenders
Derby County F.C. players
Preston North End F.C. players
Chesterfield F.C. players
Dagenham & Redbridge F.C. players
Telford United F.C. players
Ilkeston Town F.C. (1945) players
Nuneaton Borough F.C. players
Shepshed Dynamo F.C. players
English Football League players
National League (English football) players